Dmitry Morozov (born 5 May 1971) is a Russian politician, and former deputy for the United Russia party in the 7th State Duma of the Russian Federation. He was the head of the committee for health.

References

Seventh convocation members of the State Duma (Russian Federation)
21st-century Russian politicians
Living people
United Russia politicians
1971 births